Bury Your Dead is the fourth studio album by American metalcore band Bury Your Dead. It is the first record made after the departure of vocalist Mat Bruso and is also the first full-length album not to have all of the song titles follow a common theme. The album shares its title with the band's first EP they released, which was also self-titled.

The album sold 4,700 copies in its first week of release entering the Billboard 200 at number 176.

Guitarist Mark Tremonti (from Alter Bridge and Creed) appears on the record, performing the guitar solo on the song "Year One".

Track listing

Band members
 Myke Terry – vocals
 Brendan MacDonald – guitar
 Eric Ellis – guitar
 Aaron Patrick – bass guitar
 Mark Castillo – drums

Personnel
Music and Lyrics – Bury Your Dead
Recorded at – Audiohammer Studios (November through December 2007)
Produced and mixed – Jason Suecof and Bury Your Dead
Mark Tremonti appears courtesy of Universal Republic Records, A Division of UMG Recordings, Inc.
Layout design – Keith Barney
Photography – Karen Jerzyk Photography

References

2008 albums
Bury Your Dead albums
Victory Records albums
Albums produced by Jason Suecof